Franz von Ballestrem (born September 5 1834 in Plawniowitz, near Gleiwitz in Silesia; died December 23 1910 in Plawniowitz) was a German entrepreneur, mining industrialst and politician for Centre Party.

Life 

His parents were Carl Wolfgang von Ballestrem (1801–1879) and Betha von Leithold (1803–1874).He went to Adelskonvikt in Lviv. From 1848 to 1851 he went to school in Głogów and Namur. He studied at Berg Academy in Liège. Since 1855 Ballestrem was in Prussian Army and became in 1857 prussian army officer in 1st (Silesian) Life Cuirassiers "Great Elector". He was 1866 soldier in Austro-Prussian War and 1870/1871 in Franco-Prussian War. Since 1867 he was Rittmeister. After death of his father he owned majorat in Plawniowitz in Silesia.
From 1872 to 1893 and from 1898 to 1907 Ballestrem was member of the Reichstag of the German Empire. From 1898 to 1907 Ballestrem was president of the Reichstag. From 1891 to 1903 Ballestrem was also member of Prussian House of Representatives.

In 1872 he was vicepresident of Katholikentag in Breslau. In 1890 he was founder and president of People's Association for Catholic Germany in Silesia. Since 1873 Ballestrem was Papal gentleman (Camerieri Segreti di Spada e Cappa). He was member of Order of the Holy Sepulchre and of Sovereign Military Order of Malta.
On 21 June 1858 he married Hedwig Gräfin von Saurma, Freiin von und zu der Jeltsch (born November 12, 1838; died March 5, 1915). Together they had several children:
 Valentin Wolfgang Gustav Alexander Joseph Christian (born 21. Dezember 1860; died 17. Mai 1920) ∞ Gräfin Agnes zu Stolberg-Stolberg (born 11 May 1874; died 26 March 1940)
 Johann Baptists Wolfgang Karl Raphael (born 24 October 1866; died 27 July 1929)
 Pia Hedwigis Luise Katharina Viktoria (born 10 Februar 1869; died 10 July 1918)
 Bertha Maria Ludmilla Maritia (born 7 April 1870; died 19 May 1939)
 Gustav Franz Xaver Wolfgang Maria Friedrich Meinrad (born 16 April 1872; died 24 April 1909)
 Leo Wolfgang (born 20. October 1873; died 4. Juli 1915) ∞ Eva von Durant (born 18 October 1882; died 10 April 1958)
 Ludwig-Carl (born 5 October 1875; died 6 March 1957)
 Elisabeth (born 16 April 1878; died 15 March 1969)
 Marco (born 26 April 1881; died 17 April 1965)

Literature over Franz von Ballestrem 
 Eckhard Hansen, Florian Tennstedt (ed.) u. a.: Biographisches Lexikon zur Geschichte der deutschen Sozialpolitik 1871 bis 1945. Band 1: Sozialpolitiker im Deutschen Kaiserreich 1871 bis 1918. Kassel University Press, Kassel 2010, ISBN 978-3-86219-038-6, p. 7 f. (Online, pdf-file).
 
 Acta Borussica Band 8/I (1890–1900) (pdf-file)
 Acta Borussica Band 8/II (1890–1900) Kurzbiografie on p. 487. (pdf-file)
 Acta Borussica Band 9 (1900–1909) Kurzbiografie auf p. 329. (pdf-file)
 Acta Borussica Band 10 (1909–1918) Kurzbiografie auf p. 359. (pdf-file)
 Gothaisches genealogisches Taschenbuch der gräflichen Häuser auf das Jahr 1876, p.56

External links 

 
 
 Biography on website Ballestremschen Firmen- and Familienarchivs
 Literaturliste im Online-Katalog der Staatsbibliothek zu Berlin

References 

People from Gliwice County
German Roman Catholics
19th-century German politicians
20th-century German politicians
Members of the 2nd Reichstag of the German Empire
Members of the 3rd Reichstag of the German Empire
Members of the 4th Reichstag of the German Empire
Members of the 5th Reichstag of the German Empire
Members of the 6th Reichstag of the German Empire
Members of the 7th Reichstag of the German Empire
Members of the 8th Reichstag of the German Empire
Members of the 10th Reichstag of the German Empire
Members of the 11th Reichstag of the German Empire
Members of the Reichstag of the German Empire
Centre Party (Germany) politicians
Member of the Prussian National Assembly
German mining businesspeople
1834 births
1910 deaths